Álvaro Enrique Solano Artavia (born 25 June 1961) is a retired Costa Rican football player, who used to play as a midfielder.

Club career
Solano made his professional debut for Alajuelense on 2 July 1978 against Limonense and went on to play 396 games for them, ranking him 4th on the club's all-time appearances list. He scored his first goal on 18 March 1979 against Barrio México. He later played for Carmelita.

International career
He made his debut for Costa Rica in a March 1983 friendly match against Mexico and earned a total of 14 caps (excluding 12 unofficial matches), scoring 2 goals. He represented his country in 8 FIFA World Cup qualification matches and he played at the 1984 Summer Olympics.

His final international was a February 1990 FIFA World Cup warm-up match against the Soviet Union.

Managerial career
After retiring as a player, he became manager of his beloved Liga in 1999 and also was in charge at Carmelita, Santa Bárbara and Municipal Puntarenas. He returned as caretaker at the helm of Alajuelense in January 2007, replacing Colombian José Cheché Hernández.

References

External links

1961 births
Living people
People from Alajuela
Association football midfielders
Costa Rican footballers
Costa Rica international footballers
Olympic footballers of Costa Rica
Footballers at the 1984 Summer Olympics
L.D. Alajuelense footballers
A.D. Carmelita footballers
Costa Rican football managers
L.D. Alajuelense managers
Liga FPD players